Johann Richard Pfanzagl (2 July 1928 – 4 June 2019) was an Austrian mathematician known for his research in mathematical statistics.

Life and career 
Pfanzagl studied from 1946 to 1951 at the University of Vienna and received his doctorate there in 1951 with Johann Radon and Edmund Hlawka on the topic of Hermitian forms in imaginary square number fields. In the same year he became a founding member of the Austrian Statistical Society, of which he was executive secretary from 1955 to 1959. From 1951 to 1959, Pfanzagl headed the statistical office of the Austrian Federal Economic Chamber. In 1959 he habilitated as a professor for statistics at the University of Vienna. Since 1960 he was a member of the Austrian Mathematical Society. At the same year, he moved to the University of Cologne, where he has held two chairs, one after the other, from 1960 to 1964 for economic and social statistics and from 1964 until his retirement in 1995 for mathematical statistics.

Pfanzagl became an honorary member of the Institute of Mathematical Statistics in 1968. From 1993 he was a corresponding member of the mathematics and natural sciences class abroad at the Austrian Academy of Sciences and received an honorary doctorate from the Vienna University of Economics and Business in 1993. He became an honorary member of the Austrian Statistical Society in 1996.

Bibliography 
 
 
 
 
 
 
 
 
 
 
 Die axiomatischen Grundlagen einer allgemeinen Theorie des Messens. Schriftenreihe des Statistischen Instituts der Universität Wien N. F. Nr. 1, Physica-Verlag, 1959.

References

External links 
 Über Johann Pfanzagl Facultas Verlags- und Buchhandels AG, retrieved 22 September 2022
 Johann Pfanzagl Mathematics Genealogy Project, retrieved 22 September 2022
 J. Pfanzagl Website der Universität zu Köln, Abteilung Mathematik, retrieved 22 September 2022
 Johann Richard Pfanzagl 1928–2019. In: Österreichische Mathematische Gesellschaft (Hrsg.): Internationale Mathematische Nachrichten. Nr. 242, 73. Jahrgang, December 2019, Kapitel: Nachrichten der Österreichischen Mathematischen Gesellschaft. , S. 45. (oemg.ac.at, PDF).

2019 deaths
1928 births
Academic staff of the University of Cologne
Corresponding Members of the Austrian Academy of Sciences
University of Vienna alumni
20th-century Austrian mathematicians
Austrian statisticians
Academic staff of the University of Vienna
People from Vienna
Mathematical statisticians